Flåm Utvikling is a railway company that manages the tourist line Flåm Line (Flåmsbana) in Vestland county, Norway.

History

Up until 1998 it was Norges Statsbaner who operated the line, but then Flåm Utvikling took over the role, though NSB still actually operates the trains with the railway line itself is owned by Jernbaneverket. The company operates five El 17 Locomotives, and has two trains with a locomotive at each end of six B3 passenger cars on the 20 km long Flåmsbana. The rolling stock is painted green. The El 17 replaced the aging El 11 in 1998.

References

Railway companies of Norway
Transport companies of Vestland
Railway companies established in 1998
1998 establishments in Norway